Joseph Marie Régis Belzile (13 April 1931 – 4 September 2018) was a Chadian Canadian Roman Catholic bishop.

Belzile was born in Canada and was ordained to the priesthood in 1961. He served as bishop of the Roman Catholic Diocese of Moundou, Chad, from 1975 to 1985.

Notes

1931 births
2018 deaths
People from Amqui
20th-century Canadian Roman Catholic priests
20th-century Roman Catholic bishops in Chad
Roman Catholic bishops of Moundou